Astika is a Bulgarian beer brand made in the city of Haskovo. The Astika Brewery was established in 1980, and in 1995 was bought by Kamenitza, itself currently owned by Molson Coors. It has two brands – Astika Light (originally Astika Lux) and Astika Dark (5.6%, sold in winter). As of 2012, Astika is sold in 600 ml bottles, with a pull-off top, as well as 500ml cans as of 2017 that are priced at 1.05 лв Bulgarian lev

External links 

 Astika at Molson Coors
 Astika at Kamenitza

Beer in Bulgaria
Molson Coors brands
Products introduced in 1980